{{Infobox nobility
|name                      =Henriette of Cleves
|title                =suo jure Duchess of Nevers suo jure Countess, then Duchess of Rethel Princess of Mantua|image                     =Henriette de Nevers.jpg
|caption                   =Portrait of Henriette of Cleves painted by François Clouet on an unknown date
|spouse                    =Louis I of Gonzaga, Duke of Nevers
|issue                     =Catherine, Duchess of Longueville Marie Henriette, Duchess of MayenneFrederic GonzagaFrancois GonzagaCharles I, Duke of Mantua
|noble family              = La Marck
|father                    =Francis I of Cleves, 1st Duke of Nevers, Count of Rethel
|mother                   =Marguerite of Bourbon-La Marche
|birth_date             =31 October 1542
|birth_place            =La Chapelle-d'Angillon,  Cher, France
|death_date             = 
|death_place            =Hôtel de Nevers, Paris, France
|burial_place = Nevers Cathedral
|}}

Henriette de La Marck (31 October 1542 – 24 June 1601), also known as Henriette of Cleves, was a French noblewoman and courtier. She was the 4th Duchess of Nevers, suo jure Countess of Rethel, and Princess of Mantua  by her marriage with Louis I of Gonzaga-Nevers. A very talented landowner, she was one of France's chief creditors until her death.

 Early life 

Henriette was born in La Chapelle-d'Angillon, in the department of Cher, France, on 31 October, 1542. She was the eldest daughter and second child of Francis I of Cleves, 1st Duke of Nevers, Count of Rethel, and his wife, Marguerite of Bourbon-La Marche. Dauphin Henry (future King Henry II of France) acted as her godfather at her baptism. She had many siblings, including her brothers Francis and James, her father's heirs as rulers of Nevers and Rethel,  Henri (who died young), Catherine, and Marie.

Henriette soon obtained an office at court as the lady-in-waiting of Queen Catherine de' Medici. She became the intimate personal friend and confidant of Princess Marguerite. On 4 March 1565, 22-years old
Henriette married Louis I Gonzaga, Prince of Mantua in Moulins, Bourbonnais.

 Duchess of Nevers and Rethel 

After her eldest brother Francis had died in 1562 and brother James in 1564 without leaving heirs, Henriette became the suo jure 4th Duchess of Nevers and Countess of Rethel. She had been left with enormous debts from her late father and brothers, but managed well her lands and brought the financial situation back in order. Her profits were such that she eventually became one of the chief creditors of France's unstable state during the Wars of Religion.

Henriette died at the Hôtel de Nevers in Paris, on 24 June 1601 at the age of 58. She was buried in Nevers Cathedral at the side of her husband, who had preceded her in death in 1595.

 Issue 
 Catherine (21 January 1568 - 1 December 1629): Married Henry I, Duke of Longueville,  by whom she had one son, Henri II d'Orléans, Duke of Longueville.
 Maria Henrietta (3 September 1571 - 3 August 1601): Married Henry of Lorraine, Duke of Mayenne.
 Frederick (11 March 1573 - 22 April 1574): Died in infancy.
 Francis (17 September 1576 - 13 June 1580): Died in childhood.
 Charles (6 May 1580- 20 September 1637): Succeeded his parents as Duke of Nevers, Rethel, Mantua, and Montferrat. Married Catherine Mayenne,  daughter of Charles of Lorraine, Duke of Mayenne and Henriette of Savoy, Marquise of Villars, by whom he had six children, including Charles II Gonzaga and Anna Gonzaga.

 Rumors 
It was alleged that she and Marguerite (now Queen of Navarre) woke up the middle of the night, removed the heads which had been placed on public display, embalmed them, and buried them in consecrated ground.

In fiction
 Henriette of Cleves is a character in the book La Reine Margot  by Alexandre Dumas.
 Henriette of Cleves, played by Dominique Blanc, has an important role in the movie La Reine Margot''.

Ancestry

References

Sources

1542 births
1601 deaths
16th-century women rulers
17th-century women rulers
House of La Marck
People from Cher (department)
French duchesses
French countesses
Italian nobility
House of Gonzaga
16th-century peers of France
17th-century peers of France
16th-century French women
17th-century French women
Household of Catherine de' Medici